Mirex is an organochloride that was commercialized as an insecticide.

Mirex may also refer to:

 MIREX (music), the Music Information Retrieval Evaluation eXchange
 Mirex (company), a Russian company